Zhuravinka is a rural locality in Kosteltsevsky Selsoviet Rural Settlement, Kurchatovsky District, Kursk Oblast, Russia. Population:

Geography 

 Climate
Zhuravinka has a warm-summer humid continental climate (Dfb in the Köppen climate classification).

Transport 
Zhuravinka is located 34 km from the federal route  Crimea Highway, 20 km from the road of regional importance  (Kursk – Lgov – Rylsk – border with Ukraine), 14 km from the road  (Lgov – Konyshyovka), 5 km from the road of intermunicipal significance  (38K-017 – Nikolayevka – Shirkovo), 2.5 km from the road  (38N-362 – Kosteltsevo – Zaprutye), 15.5 km from the nearest railway station Konyshyovka (railway line Navlya – Lgov-Kiyevsky).

References

Notes

Sources

Rural localities in Kurchatovsky District, Kursk Oblast